Rhytiphora maculicornis is a species of beetle in the family Cerambycidae. It was described by Francis Polkinghorne Pascoe in 1858. It is from Australia.

References

maculicornis
Beetles described in 1858